Adolf Stelzer (1 September 1908 – 30 April 1977) was a Swiss footballer who played for Switzerland in the 1938 FIFA World Cup. He also played for FC Zürich, FC Lausanne-Sport, and FC La Chaux-de-Fonds.

References

External links
Profile at FIFA.com

1908 births
1977 deaths
Swiss men's footballers
Switzerland international footballers
1938 FIFA World Cup players
Association football defenders
FC Zürich players
FC Lausanne-Sport players
FC La Chaux-de-Fonds players